Leucanopsis infucata is a moth of the family Erebidae. It was described by Carlos Berg in 1882 and is found in Argentina.

Taxonomy
It was placed as a synonym of Leucanopsis leucanina by George Hampson in 1901. Research in 2014 concluded it is a valid species.

References

infucata
Moths described in 1882